Calligenethlon is an extinct genus of embolomere reptiliomorph from the Late Carboniferous of Joggins, Nova Scotia. It is the only definitively identified embolomere from the Joggins Fossil Cliffs and is the largest tetrapod to have been found preserved in lycopod tree stumps.

References

Embolomeres
Carboniferous tetrapods of North America
Paleozoic life of Nova Scotia